Bolivia is a country in South America. 

Bolivia may also refer to:

Places
Bolivia, New South Wales, a village in Australia
Bolivia, Cuba in the province of Ciego de Ávila
Bolivia, Illinois, U.S.
Bolivia, North Carolina, U.S.

Other uses
Bolivia (film), directed by Israel Adrián Caetano in 2001
Bolívia (footballer) (born 1986), Anderson Rodrigues Cardoso, Brazilian footballer
"Bolivia" (Walton song), a jazz standard by Cedar Walton
Bolivia (Gato Barbieri album), a 1973 jazz album by Gato Barbieri
Bolivia (Freddie Hubbard album), a 1991 jazz album by Freddie Hubbard
A character from the television series Fringe
A card game that is a variant of canasta